The Grace Murray Hopper Award (named for computer pioneer RADM Grace Hopper) has been awarded by the Association for Computing Machinery (ACM) since 1971. The award goes to a computer professional who makes a single, significant technical or service contribution at or before age 35.



Recipients
 1971 Donald Knuth
 1972 Paul H. Dirksen
 1972 Paul H. Cress
 1973 Lawrence M. Breed
 1973 Richard H. Lathwell
 1973 Roger Moore
 1974 George N. Baird
 1975 Allan L. Scherr
 1976 Edward H. Shortliffe
 1977 no award
 1978 Ray Kurzweil
 1979 Steve Wozniak
 1980 Robert M. Metcalfe
 1981 Daniel S. Bricklin
 1982 Brian K. Reid
 1983 no award
 1984 Daniel Henry Holmes Ingalls, Jr.
 1985 Cordell Green
 1986 William Nelson "Bill" Joy
 1987 John Ousterhout
 1988 Guy L. Steele Jr.
 1989 W. Daniel Hillis
 1990 Richard Stallman
 1991 Feng-hsiung Hsu
 1992 no award
 1993 Bjarne Stroustrup
 1994–1995 no award
 1996 Shafrira Goldwasser
 1997-1998 no award
 1999 Wen-mei Hwu
 2000 Lydia Kavraki
 2001 George Necula
 2002 Ramakrishnan Srikant
 2003 Stephen W. Keckler
 2004 Jennifer Rexford
 2005 Omer Reingold
 2006 Dan Klein
 2007 Vern Paxson
 2008 Dawson Engler
 2009 Tim Roughgarden
 2010  Craig Gentry
 2011 Luis von Ahn
 2012 Martin Casado and Dina Katabi
 2013 Pedro Felipe Felzenszwalb
 2014 Sylvia Ratnasamy
 2015 Brent Waters
 2016 Jeffrey Heer
 2017 Amanda Randles
 2018 Constantinos Daskalakis and Michael J. Freedman
 2019 Maria-Florina Balcan
 2020 Shyamnath Gollakota
 2021 Raluca Ada Popa

See also

 List of computer-related awards
 List of computer science awards

References

External links

 The ACM homepage for the Grace Murray Hopper Award

Association for Computing Machinery
Computer science awards
Computer-related awards
Awards established in 1971